Curtained hair or curtains is a hairstyle featuring a long fringe divided in either a middle parting or a side parting, with short (or shaved) sides and back. Curtained hair generally applies to males, although an alternative name, the undercut, is used for both male and female haircuts following this style. Variations on this haircut have been popular in Europe, North America, and Japan throughout the 20th century and in the 21st century, peaking between 1986 and 2001.

Origins

A shorter version of the haircut parted in the middle and kept in place with pomade became popular during the Edwardian era as a more practical alternative to the longer hair and sideburns fashionable from the 1840s to 1890s. This was due in part to the popularity of sporting activities like rugby football among younger men.

From the turn of the century until the 1920s, a longer variant of the undercut was popular among young working-class men, especially members of street gangs. In interwar Glasgow, Neds, the precursors to the Teddy Boys, favoured a haircut that was long on top and cropped at the back and sides. Despite the fire risk, much paraffin wax was used to keep the hair in place. Other gangs who favored this haircut were the Scuttlers of Manchester, and the Peaky Blinders of Birmingham because longer hair put the wearer at a disadvantage in a street fight.

Revival
During the late 1980s centrally parted hair, derived from the bowl cut, made a comeback among fans of new wave, synthpop, and electronic music as an alternative to the mullets and backcombed hair worn by glam metal bands.

In the UK, curtains were popularised during the early 1990s by the Baggy or Madchester scene as well as contemporary Shoegaze and Britpop bands such as The Happy Mondays, Inspiral Carpets, early Blur, The Beautiful South, and the Stone Roses. It was also popular in the UK because of David Beckham's hair in the late 1990s.

A longer, collar-length version of the haircut went mainstream in the early to mid-1990s and was worn by many celebrities, most notably Tom Cruise.

During the early 2020s the haircut had a resurgence in popularity, driven largely by the social media platform TikTok and K-pop. As a result, the haircut has become favored among youth, and is considered an attractive hairstyle for males. This came with a general revival of 90s fashion by TikTok users.

In popular culture
Actors who have worn the longer version of curtained hair include Tom Cruise in Mission: Impossible 2, Brendan Fraser in The Mummy Returns, Leonardo DiCaprio in Titanic, River Phoenix in Indiana Jones and the Last Crusade, and David Duchovny in earlier seasons of The X-Files.

Many manga and anime characters, such as Dragon Ball protagonist Trunks, James from Pokémon's Team Rocket, Fullmetal Alchemist's Edward Elric, Levi Ackerman from Attack on Titan, Vinsmoke Sanji from One Piece, and Naruto's Sasuke and his older brother, Itachi Uchiha have this haircut. Japanese video game characters with this haircut include James Sunderland from Silent Hill 2, Squall Leonhart from Final Fantasy VIII, Sothe from Fire Emblem: Radiant Dawn, Raziel from Legacy of Kain, Leon S. Kennedy from Resident Evil 4, Kyo Kusanagi and various other characters from The King of Fighters, and Link from The Legend of Zelda: Ocarina of Time.

Most male K-Pop stars utilize this haircut, such as members of BTS, Monsta X, NCT, EXO.

See also
 List of hairstyles
 1980s in fashion
 1990s in fashion

References

External links
 
 

Hairstyles
20th-century fashion
21st-century fashion